The  Slide Cube Projector is a slide projector and system, manufactured and marketed by Bell & Howell.  Introduced in 1970 and marketed through the 1980s, the projector derived its name from its plastic slide storage cube-shaped magazine, about 5.5 cm in each dimension (a bit larger than a slide), and held 36–44 slides, depending on the mount thickness.  Each cube had an operable sliding lid to hold the slides in the cube. The system consisted of Slide Cubes and a special projector to receive the cubes. Bell and Howell subsequently introduced a Slide Cube Projector II, with revised features.

Unlike trays used in straight-tray slide projector or carousel slide projectors, the slides in a Slide Cube are not stored in separate slots, rather they are stacked together, one on top of the other. After a cube is manually set into the PRE-LOAD position and then manually slid into the LOAD position, the action causes the cube's lid to open. The advance trigger is activated, a sequence is initiated when the slide is advanced into the LOAD position. The advance mechanism allows one slide to drop from the loaded cube into a slide-size hole in a circular turntable to rotate through the next four positions. The turntable is thinner than one slide and is designed to allow one slide to drop and move forward to a PREVIEW position, PROJECTION position, and RETURN position, the latter from which it can be returned to allow for a single slide's worth of backup, and then finally to a reload position, where it drops into a stack that is then manually elevated up into an empty cube.

The projector itself used a 300 watt quartz bulb, and could optionally be operated by a tethered remote control. The projector featured an integrated handle, plastic lid or optional lid which incorporated additional cubestorage. An adjustable foot allowed aim the projector vertically.

Bell and Howell Slide Cube Projectors were less expensive than trays and allowed for higher storage capacity, where a book or drawer of 16 forty-slide cubes (640 slides) occupied the space of a single round tray holding at most 140 slides — roughly eight times as many slides in the same space — and theoretically one eighth the cost. Two features, stack storage and preview, made for easier editing of slide shows; slides can be added to or removed from the show without having to shift all of the remaining slides up or down in their slots one at a time. Some tray-based projectors (e.g. some Kodak round-tray and Hähnel straight-tray slide projectors) can use stack loaders to view a stack of slides, but they don't lend themselves to this type of operation and there is no associated storage system.

The slide cube had drawbacks, including the inability to reverse to more than one slide, the fragility of the cubes, and the advancing plate's tendency to jam — interrupting slide shows and making the projectors challenging to operate.

Though Slide Cube Projectors are no longer manufactured, cubes, bulbs and a few replacement parts as well as used projectors and cubes remain available on the second hand market.

See also 
Franke & Heidecke Rolleiscop

Slide projectors